McMaster is a surname. Notable people with the surname include:

 Andrew Ross McMaster (1876–1937), Canadian politician
 A. T. McMaster (1918–2002), American politician
 Bill McMaster (born 1930), Australian rules football coach and former player
 Bob McMaster (1921–2003), Australian rugby union and rugby league footballer, and wrestler
 Carolyn McMaster, Canadian film producer
 Cecil McMaster (1895–1981), South African Olympic athlete
 Drew McMaster (born 1959), retired Scottish sprinter
 Elizabeth McMaster (1847–1903), Canadian humanitarian
 Fergus McMaster (1879–1950), Australian businessman
 Gordon McMaster (1960–1997), Scottish politician
 Griffin McMaster (born 1983), Australian football (soccer) player
 H. R. McMaster (born 1962), United States Army officer and former National Security Advisor to Donald Trump
 Harold McMaster (1916–2003), inventor and entrepreneur in the glass industry
 Henry McMaster (born 1947), the current Governor of South Carolina
 I. D. McMaster (1923/24–2004), American assistant district attorney, and district judge for the 179th Criminal Court in Harris County, Texas (1972–1988)
 Jamie McMaster (born 1982), English-Australian football (soccer) player
 James McMaster 19th-century American Catholic newspaper editor
 Joseph McMaster (1861–1929), English cricketer with an extremely short career
 Kyron McMaster (born 1997), British Virgin Islands hurdler
 Lois McMaster Bujold (born 1949), American author
 Luke McMaster (born c. 1970s), American musician of McMaster & James
 Mary L. McMaster, American oncologist and clinical trialist
 Que McMaster, (born 1942), former collegiate track and field coach
 Rhyll McMaster (born 1947), contemporary Australian poet and novelist
 Sam McMaster, the General Manager of the Los Angeles Kings (NHL) from 1994 to 1997
 Sherman McMaster (1853 – c. 1892), American outlaw and law-enforcement officer
 Stanley McMaster (1926–1992), Unionist politician and barrister in Northern Ireland
 Susan McMaster (born 1950), Canadian poet, literary editor, and spoken word performer
 Valentine Munbee McMaster (1834–1872), Irish war-time surgeon
 William McMaster (1811–1887), wholesaler, Senator and banker
 William McMaster (businessman) (1851–1930), industrial executive in Quebec 
 William H. McMaster (1877–1968), the tenth Governor of South Dakota

See also
 MacMaster (surname)
 McMasters (surname)